Sisevac is a village in the municipality of Paraćin, Serbia. According to the 2002 census, the village has a population of 18 people.

Tourism
Sisevac is an attractive tourist place with its sports terrains and big swimming pool with thermal water of 36°C (96.8 °F). In addition there is also a smaller swimming pool within a tourist complex “Potičara”, which beside a restaurant also has a guest house with 38 beds. 
On the south side of the complex, there is a lake for sport fishing filled with common carp, cat fish and other fish sorts. 
In addition fresh trout is available from a nearby trout fish pond.

References

External links

Sisevac

Populated places in Pomoravlje District